Mosby Creek is a stream in southeastern Pettis County in the U.S. state of Missouri. It is a tributary to Anderson Branch which is in turn a tributary of Walnut Creek. Sedalia is approximately nine miles to the north.

Mosby Creek has the name of one Mr. Mosby, the original owner of the site.

See also
List of rivers of Missouri

References

Rivers of Pettis County, Missouri
Rivers of Missouri